The Thackeray family is one of the most well-known and powerful political families in the Indian state of Maharashtra.

Keshav Sitaram Thackeray was one of the prominent leaders of the Samyukta Maharashtra Movement.

Family tree
This is the family tree of the Thackeray family.

See also 
Nehru–Gandhi family

References

Marathi families
Hindu families
Political families of India
 
Shiv Sena